The Worst Ones is a 2022 French drama film directed by Lise Akoka and Romane Gueret.

Premise
The film tells behind the scenes of a shoot in the North of France. A film director chooses to shoot in the Picasso city, in Boulogne-sur-Mer. He sends out a casting, looking for atypical personalities: young school dropouts, ADHD sufferers, foster children, young people leaving home... He chooses two girls and two boys, Lily, Maylis, Jessy and Ryan. Everyone is surprised by this choice: why did he only take “the worst”? Local associations are worried about the impossible hopes represented by the easy life of a film crew, the filmmaker is worried about reinforcing the stereotypes he wanted to denounce.

The film portrays its heroes. Raised by his sister, Ryan suffers from attention disorders and hyperactivity and cannot stand the school environment despite the help of his life assistant. Lily goes from one guy to another, and we discover that she is weakened by the death of her brother, who died of cancer. Maylis, very little expansive, wonders about her participation in the shooting. Jessy, finally, plays the provocateur but he hides flaws too.

Cast

Production
Akoka and Gueret had previously made a short film, Chasse Royale, dealing with the practice of film casting. After that, they decided to create a story about film production.

Release
The Worst Ones premiered 22 May at the 2022 Cannes Film Festival, where it won the Prix Un Certain Regard. It was theatrically released in France on 7 December 2022 by Pyramide Distribution.

Reception
On the review aggregator website Rotten Tomatoes, the film has an approval rating of 100% based on 9 reviews, with an average rating of 7.8/10.

References

External links
 
 

2022 films
2022 drama films
Films about filmmaking
French drama films
2020s French films
France 3 Cinéma films